"Looking Over My Shoulder" is a song by American band 'Til Tuesday, which was released in 1985 as the second single from their debut studio album Voices Carry. The song was written by Aimee Mann, Michael Hausman, Robert Holmes and Joey Pesce, and produced by Mike Thorne. "Looking Over My Shoulder" peaked at No. 61 on the US Billboard Hot 100.

Music video
The song's music video was directed by Nick Haggerty and produced by Paul Schiff for N. Lee Lacy & Associates. It was shot during July 1985 in the Manhattan borough of New York City, including at the Convent of the Sacred Heart. The video received active rotation on MTV.

Critical reception
On its release as a single, Billboard described "Looking Over My Shoulder" as a "broad, sweeping tune" and praised Mann for "the best Bowie soundalike vocal yet achieved by a woman". Cash Box considered the song a "certain pop hit". They commented, "The moody verses give way to an infectious, effective chorus. Mann's vocal is strong and similar in intensity to her previous outing." In a retrospective review of Voices Carry, Joe Viglione of AllMusic noted the song's "bubbling intensity which Holmes' guitar adds drama to".

Track listing
7" single
"Looking Over My Shoulder" (Single Mix) – 3:50
"Don't Watch Me Bleed" – 3:26

7" single (US promo)
"Looking Over My Shoulder" (Single Mix) – 3:50
"Looking Over My Shoulder" (Single Mix) – 3:50

12" (US promo)
"Looking Over My Shoulder" (Single Mix) – 3:50
"Looking Over My Shoulder" (Long Version) – 4:06

Personnel
'Til Tuesday
 Aimee Mann – vocals, bass
 Robert Holmes – guitar, backing vocals
 Joey Pesce – synthesizer, backing vocals
 Michael Hausman – drums, percussion

Production
 Mike Thorne – producer
 Bob Clearmountain – mixing on "Looking Over My Shoulder" (Single Mix)
 Domenic Maita – engineer
 Mike Krowiak, Jeff Lippay – studio assistants
 Harvey Goldberg – mixing engineer
 Moira Marquis – mixing assistant
 Jack Skinner – mastering

Other
 Britain Hill – photography
 Hiro Ito – photography (Japanese sleeve)

Charts

References

1985 songs
1985 singles
'Til Tuesday songs
Epic Records singles
Songs written by Aimee Mann
Song recordings produced by Mike Thorne
Songs written by Michael Hausman
Songs written by Robert Holmes (musician)